Barleria obtusa, the bush violet, is a species of flowering plant in the family Acanthaceae. It occurs naturally along forest margins in the summer rainfall region of South Africa. It is widely cultivated as a decorative garden shrub.

Uses 
 
In tropical Africa, the leaves are cooked as a vegetable, and the plant is used medicinally.

References

External links
 Species account. Advice on cultivation
 Barleria obtusa Nees

obtusa
Flora of South Africa